The Finch, Vanslyck and McConville Dry Goods Company Building is a classical revival warehouse building designed by James E. Denson, built by George Grant Construction Company, in 1911 and 1923; it is part of Lowertown Historic District in Saint Paul, Minnesota, United States.  It fronts Mears Park and is currently used as residential apartments, under the name of Cosmopolitan Apartments. It is listed on the National Register of Historic Places.

References

Individually listed contributing properties to historic districts on the National Register in Minnesota
Industrial buildings completed in 1911
National Register of Historic Places in Saint Paul, Minnesota
Warehouses on the National Register of Historic Places
Neoclassical architecture in Minnesota
1911 establishments in Minnesota